Henry M. Grey (dates unknown) was a late 19th-century and early 20th-century English adventurer and author of travel literature.

Works
Lloyd's Yesterday and To-day (1893). Illus. William Douglas Almond.
In Moorish captivity : an account of the "Tourmaline" expedition to Sus, 1897-98 (1899). Illus. Arthur Twidle. From Internet Archive.
The Land of To-Morrow: a mule-back trek through the swamps and forests of eastern Bolivia (1927).

External links
The Geographical Journal, Vol. 73, No. 3 (Mar., 1929), pp. 291-292. Review of The Land of To-Morrow.

English non-fiction writers
Year of death missing
Year of birth missing
English male non-fiction writers